Louis Gérardin (12 August 1912 in Boulogne-Billancourt – 23 May 1982 in Paris) was a French track cyclist.

During his career, he won the World Amateur Sprint Championships in 1930, and was a 12 time national sprint champion.

Major results

1930
1st  Amateur World Sprint Championships
1st Grand Prix de Copenhagen
1931
1st  National Winter Sprint Championships
1932
1st  National Sprint Championships
1935
1st  National Sprint Championships
1936
1st  National Sprint Championships
1st Grand Prix de l'UVF
1937
1st Grand Prix de l'UVF
1938
1st  National Sprint Championships
1938
1st Grand Prix de Paris
1941
1st  National Sprint Championships
1st Grand Prix de Paris
1st Grand Prix de l'UVF
1942
1st  National Sprint Championships
1943
1st  National Sprint Championships
1st Grand Prix de Paris
1945
1st  National Sprint Championships
1946
1st  National Sprint Championships
1949
1st  National Sprint Championships
1950
1st  National Sprint Championships
1953
1st  National Sprint Championships

References

1912 births
1982 deaths
French male cyclists